Born to Reign is the third studio album released by American actor and rapper Will Smith. The album was released on Columbia Records in the United States on June 25, 2002 and was considered a drop from his previous level of success, having only reached Gold status by the Recording Industry Association of America (RIAA), whereas Big Willie Style and Willennium both reached multi-platinum status. This album includes "Black Suits Comin, which was also the lead single from the original motion picture soundtrack of Men in Black II. The album also spawned the European hit single "1000 Kisses", which features vocals from Smith's wife Jada Pinkett Smith.

Reception

Critical
AllMusic gave the album a four-star rating, claiming: 

"It'd be inaccurate to call Will Smith's third album the musical equivalent of Ali -- a bid for artistic credibility from an artist so assured and smooth, it's been easy to pigeonhole him as merely a pop artist -- but given the range and harder edge on Born to Reign, it's hard not to think of it at first. Make no mistake, this is not as serious as Ali, nor is it a record whose first intent is to enlighten and educate. It's a fun, pop-leaning record, much like his first two records, and never is it afraid to return to the sounds and styles that brought the former Fresh Prince big hits, but among comfortably familiar jams, Smith stretches his legs. Some of the hip-hop hits harder; there's a touch of reggae; he even appropriates a bit of a Ricky Martin vibe on "I Can't Stop.

It's a small but significant change, and while it doesn't result in a record that flows as effortlessly, or giddily, as Willennium, it's easy to appreciate the effort to stretch, because even if all the experiments aren't necessarily successful, however, sometimes, the idea is better than the execution, it does reinvigorate the Smith signature pop-rap sound, apart, oddly, from the theme for Men in Black 2, "Black Suits Comin'," the only cut in this vein to fall flat, and results in another solid record from Smith. Maybe not as consistent as its predecessors, but still enjoyable in its familiar turf, while provoking admiration for its ambition, even when it's not always satisfying. Not a bad way to stretch."

Commercial
Born to Reign debuted at number 13 on the US Billboard 200, selling 60,000 copies in its first week. On July 26, 2002 the album has been certified gold by the Recording Industry Association of America (RIAA). As of April 2005, the album sold 237,000 copies in the US.

Controversy
The album was released as a copy-protected disc, which reportedly not only prevented the contents of the disc from being copied, but froze users' computers after they attempted to listen to it via their CD-ROM drives. This resulted in complaints of lost computer files due to the album's protection element.

Track listing 

Notes
 signifies a co-producer.
 signifies an additional producer.
 signifies a vocal producer.

Sample credits
"Act Like You Know" - Contains a sample of "Trans-Europe Express" by Kraftwerk
"I Can't Stop" - Contains a sample of "A Tu Vera" by Manitas de Plata
"1,000 Kisses" - Contains samples of "Never Too Much" by Luther Vandross and "Future Now" by Pleasure
"Willow Is a Player" - Contains a sample of "Love Gonna Pack Up (and Walk Out)" by The Persuaders
"How da Beat Goes" - Contains a sample of "Jam on It" by Newcleus 
"Block Party" - Contains samples of "Family Affair" by Sly and the Family Stone and "It Takes Two" by Rob Base & DJ E-Z Rock
"Give Me Tonite" - Contains a sample of "Classical Gas" by Mason Williams

Personnel
Personnel credits adapted from liner notes.

Annas Allaf – guitar , Rhodes , Pro Tools engineer 
Jerry Allen – additional production 
Rico Anderson – producer and programming 
Chandler Bridges – engineer , Pro Tools engineer 
David Campbell – string arrangements 
Rob Chiarelli – producer , additional production , bass , guitar , engineer , mixing 
Luis Conte – percussion 
Steve Churchyard – strings engineer , percussion engineer 
Tony Dofat – producer 
Brandon Duncan – engineer , Pro Tools engineer 
Ron Feemster – additional production 
Dominique Fillan – steel drums engineer 
Bryan Golder – engineer , Pro Tools engineer 
Adam "DJ AM" Goldstein – DJ scratches 
Andy Haller – engineer 
Jerry Hey – horn arrangements 
Bryon Jones – vocal producer 
John Kaplan – engineer 
Tim Kelley – producer, vocal producer, and engineer 
Mar'Laina Kemp – background vocals 
Knowledge – additional vocals 
Abe Laboriel, Jr. – drums 
L.E.S. – producer 
Manny Marroquin – mixing 
Herb Middleton – producer 
Jamie Muhoberac – keyboards 
Derek Nakamoto – string arrangements 
Andy Narell – steel drums 
Jimane Nelson – co-producer 
Gregg Pagani – producer 
Nora Payne – background vocals 
Poke & Tone – producers 
Herb Powers Jr. – mastering
O.Banga – vocal producer , additional vocals , executive producer
Rick Rock – producer 
Bob Robinson – producer 
Sauce – producer , vocal producer 
Dexter Simmons – mixing 
Jada Pinkett-Smith – featured vocals 
Will Smith – vocals, producer , executive producer
Mark Sparks – producer 
Kel Spencer – additional vocals 
Trā-Knox – vocals
Christina Vidal – featured vocals 
Erick Walls – additional production

Charts

Weekly charts

Year-end charts

Certifications

References 

Will Smith albums
2002 albums
Albums produced by Tim & Bob
Albums produced by L.E.S. (record producer)
Albums produced by Rick Rock
Columbia Records albums